The Orosirian Period (meaning "mountain range") is the third geologic period in the Paleoproterozoic Era and lasted from  Mya to  Mya (million years ago). Instead of being based on stratigraphy, these dates are defined chronometrically.

The later half of the period was an episode of intensive orogeny on virtually all continents.

Two of the largest known impact events on Earth occurred during the Orosirian. Early in the period, 2023 Mya, a large asteroid collision created the Vredefort impact structure. The event that created the Sudbury Basin structure occurred near the end of the period, 1850 Mya.

For the time period from about 2060 to 1780 Mya, an alternative period based on stratigraphy rather than chronometry, named the Columbian, was suggested in the geological timescale review 2012 edited by Gradstein et al., but , this has not yet been officially adopted by the IUGS.

Paleogeography 
The supercontinent Columbia formed at the end of this period.

References 
 
 

Paleoproterozoic
Geological periods
Proterozoic geochronology